The M9, officially referred to as the M9 Ataköy-Olimpiyat line, is a rapid transit line of the Istanbul Metro system in the European part of Istanbul, Turkey.

It will run in a north-south direction, and will run through five districts of the city, namely Bakırköy, Bahçelievler, Bağcılar, Küçükçekmece and Başakşehir. The travel time between the end stations will be 19.5 minutes. It is expected that the metro line will carry around 500,000 riders daily. It will serve about 2.5 million people living in the area and visiting those districts.

Connections to other metro lines will be at Ataköy to Marmaray, at Yenibosna to M1A (Yenikapı–Atatürk Airport), at Çobançeşme to (Yenikapı-Sefaköy), at Mimar Sinan to (Kirazlı-Halkalı), at Atatürk Mahallesi to (Mahmutbey-Bahçeşehir-Esenyurt) and at İkitelli Sanayi to M3 (Kirazlı-Başakşehir Olimpiyat).

The construction of the metro line began in February 2016. The line consists of two tubes, which are being bored by four tunnel boring machines, two at each end. The city of Istanbul approved of a loan of  338 million to complete the construction.

While the Olimpiyatköy branch of the M3 line (Olimpiyat - İkitelli Sanayi) was unified with the M9 line, the first stage of the metro line (Bahariye - İkitelli Sanayi) was completed and opened on 29 May 2021. The M9 operates between Bahariye and Olimpiyat until the full opening in 2023, extending the line between Olimpiyat and Ataköy.

Stations

References

Istanbul Metro
Bakırköy
Bahçelievler
Küçükçekmece
Başakşehir
Bağcılar
Transport infrastructure under construction in Turkey